CMPak Limited, doing business under brand name Zong, is a Pakistan based mobile data network operator, owned by the company China Mobile.

It is the first overseas setup of China Mobile through acquisition of a license from Millicom to operate a GSM network in Pakistan in 2008. 
Zong is a 100% subsidiary of China Mobile.

It is Pakistan's second-largest GSM mobile service provider and third largest mobile service in terms of subscriber base of 44 million, among which 28 million are 4G/LTE subscribers. With over 14,000 4G enabled sites across the county, it has a market share of 22% among cellular operators in the country.

History
Zong commenced operations as Paktel by Cable & Wireless in 1991. It was the first company granted a free license to carry out cellular phone services in Pakistan. It carried out AMPS services until 2004, when the company launched GSM services.

In 2003, Millicom Corporation, who at that time were majority owners of Instaphone, bought Paktel from Cable & Wireless. Millicom installed a new management team headed by John Tumelty, former CEO of Instaphone, and Chief Financial Officer David Ordman.

On 22 January 2007, Millicom International Cellular S.A. stated that it would sell its 88.86 percent stake in Paktel Limited to China Mobile for $284 million, which includes the repayment of intercompany debt. The sale implies an enterprise value for Paktel of $460 million, Millicom said in its press release. Merrill Lynch advised China Mobile on the transaction.

On 4 May 2007, Paktel Limited was renamed to China Mobile Pakistan. On May 16, 2007 China Mobile announced that it had increased its stake in CMPak to 100%.

On 1 April 2008, Paktel was rebranded to Zong.

Network
China Mobile Pakistan has invested more than US$2 billion so far to build up network infrastructure in Pakistan since 2008. It will invest US$1 billion in next two to three year for next generation service roll-out.

Zong has built the third-largest cellular network in the country with over 10,000 base stations. To go green, Zong has installed solar powered cell sites in various locations. It has country's largest solar power telecommunication network.

Its network base stations, microwave links, IT support and transmission towers are maintained and provided by ZTE Pakistan.

Zong currently uses GSM, UMTS/HSPA+ and LTE technologies.

Radio frequency summary

Zong has refarmed 5 MHz of its 2100 MHz 3G spectrum for 4G. They are currently deploying (via carrier aggregation) 15 MHz of Band 3 (1800 MHz), and 10 MHz of Band 1 (2100 MHz) for LTE-A.

Next generation mobile services 
On 23 April 2014, Pakistan concluded the auction for the next generation of mobile spectrum. Zong paid $516 million for a 10 MHz spectrum in the 2.1 GHz frequency range for 3G and a 10 MHz spectrum in the 1.8 GHz frequency range for 4G, making it Pakistan's first 3G and 4G operator.

LTE Advanced (4G+) 
Zong has 4G+ (LTE-A) coverage in all major cities of Pakistan.

4G Testing 
As of August 2019, Zong is the first of three mobile network operators in Pakistan to successfully conduct 5G trials. In the trial, speeds of up to 1.14 GB/s were achieved.

Number scheming
Zong uses the following numbering scheme:

+92 3 1  N1N2N3N4N5N6N7N8

Where, 92 is the ISD code for Pakistan and is required when dialing outside the country, 3 is the mobile access code, and 1 is the prefix for Zong allocated by Pakistan Telecommunication Authority. Omitting +92 would require 0 instead to represent local call, hence 031 is the general prefix and N1N2N3N4N5N6N7N8 is the subscriber number.

Zong Fiber-to-the-Home (FTTH) 
Zong plans to launch Fiber-to-the-Home (FTTH) Broadband internet. Initially the service will only be available in select areas of Karachi.

Marketing

Stores
Zong operates 22 customer service centres, 305 franchises, and 190,000 retail customer points nationwide.

Slogans

At the time of its launch in 2008, China Mobile Pakistan ran the advertising campaign for Zong with the tagline 'Say it all'.
Now, China Mobile Pakistan runs advertising for Zong with new tagline 'A NEW DREAM'.

Products
Zong offers prepaid, postpaid, ladies, and youth plans. The postpaid, ladies, and youth plans are branded as bizXcess, Flutter, and Circle. Moreover, it also offers data plans and branch-less banking.

Partnership with Manchester United F.C.
In October 2011, Zong signed a three-year partnership deal with the English football club Manchester United F.C. The deal allowed the club's Pakistani fans to see all the goals scored, exclusive interviews, news, and behind-the-scenes access. ZONG also made a television commercial featuring the Manchester United players Dimitar Berbatov, Rio Ferdinand, Darren Fletcher, and Ashley Young playing street football with Pakistani children.

In 2012, Zong sent 32 boys for a one-week training camp to Manchester United Soccer School in Abu Dhabi. 120 teams with maximum 16 players each were identified and trials were conducted in Karachi, Lahore, Islamabad, Rawalpindi, Multan and Faisalabad by a team of professional coaches. A total of three teams were formed in Karachi, two in Lahore, one each in Islamabad-Rawalpindi, Multan and Faisalabad. The coaches then identified 32 boys to send to Abu Dhabi from these 8 teams.

Awards
On 26 September 2013, the President of Pakistan honoured Zong as the fastest growing cellular network at the Rawalpindi Chamber of Commerce and Industry.

In 2016, Zong was declared the number 1 data network by the PTA.

Mobile banking

Timepey 
Timepey was the mobile banking service offered by Zong in association with Askari Bank Limited from late 2012.
Timepey lets users pay utility bills, transfer money to specified recipients anywhere in the country, deposit and withdraw cash and carry out account transfers.

PayMax 
Discontinuing Timepey in 2017, Zong relaunched its mobile financial services with a new brand "PayMax" in association with Askari Bank Limited. PayMax lets users pay utility bills, transfer money to specified recipients anywhere in the country, deposit and withdraw cash and carry out account transfers.

Bank of Punjab partnership
The Bank of Punjab rolled out internet banking in partnership with Wateen and Zong for operations to be carried out over the internet.

See also
 List of mobile phone companies in Pakistan

References

External links

China Mobile
Mobile phone companies of Pakistan
Telecommunications-related introductions in 2008
China–Pakistan relations
Pakistani subsidiaries of foreign companies
Internet service providers of Pakistan
Companies based in Islamabad